Durak is a Turkish surname. Notable people with the surname include:

 Abdullah Durak (born 1987), Turkish footballer
 Aytaç Durak (born 1938), Turkish politician
 Fahrettin Durak (born 1966), Yugoslav footballer
 Mustafa Durak (born 1988), French footballer

Turkish-language surnames